The United Nations Appeals Tribunal (UNAT), which replaces the former United Nations Administrative Tribunal,  is an appellate court,    of the two-tier formal system of administration of justice in the UN.  It was established by the UN General Assembly  in December 2008 to review appeals against judgments rendered by the United Nations Dispute Tribunal (UNDT).  UNAT, including its registry,  is based in New York, and holds sessions in New York City, Geneva  and Nairobi, as required by caseload. It held its first session in Geneva in 2010. The UNAT is a component of the UN's Internal Justice System, and is listed as an office, along with UNDT and the Office of the United Nations Ombudsman, under the UN secretariat. The UNAT like the UNDT, is dependent for its administrative, office, staffing, and travel needs including that of the judges, on the UN secretariat.

Receivablity and effect of filing appeal
The filing of an appeal has the effect of suspending the execution of the judgement or the contested order.  For an appeal to be receivable by the Appeals Tribunal it should be: (a) pursuant to article 2 of the statute; and (b) filed within 60 calendar days of the receipt of UNDT Judgement.

Competency
The UNAT is competent to hear and pass judgement on an appeal filed against a judgement by the United Nations Dispute Tribunal when (a) UNDT Exceeded its jurisdiction or competence;(b)  Failed to exercise jurisdiction vested in it; (c) Erred on a question of law;(d)  Committed an error in procedure, such as to affect the decision of the case; or (e) Erred on a question of fact, resulting in a manifestly unreasonable decision. The Tribunal may "affirm, reverse, modify or remand the judgement of the Dispute Tribunal". The judgments of UNAT are final and binding on the parties.

Powers of AT
The Appeals Tribunal may order one or both of the following:(a) Rescission of the contested administrative decision or.... set an amount of compensation that the respondent may elect to pay as an alternative to the rescission of the contested administrative decision(b) Compensation for harm, ... which shall normally not exceed the equivalent of two years’ net base salary of the applicant. In exceptional cases it may order the payment of a higher compensation for harm".

Revision of AT judgment
Either party may apply to the Appeals Tribunal "for a revision of a judgement on the basis of the discovery of a decisive fact which was, at the time the judgement was rendered, unknown to the Appeals Tribunal and to the party applying for revision." The application for revision is to be submitted within "30 calendar days of the discovery of the fact and within one year of the date of the judgement."  In addition either party may apply  "for an interpretation of the meaning or scope of the judgement."

Submission of Appeal 
Appeals are required to be submitted to the Registrar electronically or otherwise on a prescribed form,  accompanied by:(a) A brief that explains the legal basis of any of the five grounds for appeal set out in article 2.1 of the statute relied upon.  The registrar after ensuring that the appeal complies with the laid down procedures transmit the appeal to the respondent. If the formal requirements of the article are not fulfilled, the Registrar may require the appellant to conform the appeal to the requirements of the article. The form for the appeal is available on the UN AT website.

Answers, cross-appeals and answers to cross-appeals
The respondent’s answer is required to submit within 60 days of the date on which the respondent received the appeal transmitted by the Registrar,  on a prescribed form, along with a brief,  not exceed 15 pages, setting out legal arguments in support of the answer, along with signed original answer form and the annexes. The Registrar shall transmit a copy of the answer to the appellant.

The party answering may file a cross-appeal, the appeal within 60 days of notification of the appeal, accompanied by a brief which shall not exceed 15 pages, with the Appeals Tribunal stating the relief sought and the grounds of the cross- appeal.

Issuance and publication of judgements
Judgements are given by panels of three judges are adopted by majority vote, and contain the reasons, facts and law on which they are based. The Registrar is responsible for publication of the judgements of the Appeals Tribunal on the website of the Appeal s Tribunal after they are delivered.

Format and content of documents
The UNAT tribunal has laid down that all documents are to be filed on US letter or A4 paper, should conform standard forms issued by the Appeals Tribunal, be page numbered, adhere to page limit and word count with typeface at 12 point with 1.5 line spacing, and 10 point for footnotes with single line spacing. The maximum permissible word count for each brief, including headings, footnotes and quotations, are 6,750 words for a 15-page brief, 2,250 words for a five-page brief, and 900 words for a two-page brief. Each annex to a filed document must have page numbering.

Judges of UNAT 
UNAT which became operational on 1 July 2009 is composed of seven judges. The UNAT Judges are appointed by the General Assembly on the recommendation of the Internal Justice Council in accordance with General Assembly resolution 62/228. No two judges are of the same nationality, and due regard is given "to geographical distribution and gender balance". The Judges normally review appeals in three-member panels. Article 3.

The seven judges elected by the General Assembly On 3 March 2009 were:
 Ms. Sophia Adinyira (Ghana), seven-year term
 Ms. Rose Boyko (Canada),seven-year term
 Ms. Inés Mónica Weinberg de Roca (Argentina),seven-year term
 Mr. Luis Maria Simón (Uruguay), seven-year term
 Mr. Jean Courtial (France),three-year term
 Mr. Kamaljit Singh Garewal (India),three-year term
 Mr. Mark Painter (United States),three-year term

Registry
The United Nations Appeals Tribunal Registry is located New York. It is headed by a Registrar,  a P 5 level UN paid lawyer.  The Registrar is assisted by one P 3 Legal Officer and two General Service Administrative Assistants.  In addition the registry is supported by Legal Research and Information Technology Officers, and staff.  The UNAT Registry provides technical and administrative support to the UNAT judges including by 'enforcing parties' compliance with the UNAT rules of procedure'.

UNAT Activity 2013:  Outcome of appeals by UN Staff members 
Statistically UN staff member have a low chances of getting favorable outcome from appeals to the UNAT. In 2013 out of 115 judgments by UNAT 99 were against appeals on UNDT judgements.  Out of the 99 appeals,  61 were filed by staff members, of which an overwhelming, 72 percent (44) were rejected.  In contrast out of the 38 appeals filed by the UN Secretary General against staff members, 31 or 82 percent were granted in full or in part.

OSLA
In 2013, 52 staff member chose to be self-represented either because they did not have faith in Office of Staff Legal Assistance (OSLA)  or OSLA was not forthcoming in assisting them through the appeal process. Only 32 staff members were extended OSLA assistance in the UNAT appeal process.

See also
 United Nations Dispute Tribunal 
 Office of Staff Legal Assistance (OSLA)

References

External links 
 Administrative Tribunal, International Labour Organization
 Administrative Tribunal, World Bank 
 Administrative Tribunal, International Monetary Fund 
 Administrative Tribunal, Council of Europe 
 Administrative Tribunal, EBRD

United Nations legislation
United Nations General Assembly subsidiary organs
Labour courts
International administrative tribunals
United Nations courts and tribunals
Courts and tribunals established in 2009